The Ministry of Commerce, Trade and Industry (MCTI) is a cabinet level government ministry of Zambia. It is responsible for the development of a globally competitive, sustainable, commercial, trade and industrial base in Zambia with the objective of contributing to social and economic development in the country. The ministry is headed by the Minister Commerce, Trade and Industry.

Location
The headquarters of the MCTI are located on the eighth, ninth and tenth Floors of the New Government Complex, in the Lusaka neighbourhood of Cathedral Hill.

Overview
The ministry is headed by a cabinet minister, assisted by a deputy minister, both of whom are political appointees. The Permanent Secretary, a career civil servant, oversees the five departments of the ministry. Each of the five departments is headed by a departmental director.
Department of Foreign Trade
Department of Domestic Trade
Department of Human Resources and Administration
Department of Planning and Information
Department of Industry

The MCTI works in collaboration with the following government agencies:
 Zambia Bureau of Standards
 Zambia Development Agency
 Zambia Metrology Agency 
 Patents and Companies Registration Agency
 Citizens Economic Empowerment Commission
 Competition and Consumer Protection Commission

List of ministers

Deputy ministers

References

External links
Official website

Commerce
Zambia
Zambia